Outside the Three-Mile Limit is a 1940 American crime film directed by Lewis D. Collins and written by Albert DeMond. The film stars Jack Holt, Harry Carey, Sig Ruman, Eduardo Ciannelli, Donald Briggs and Irene Ware. The film was released on March 7, 1940, by Columbia Pictures.

Plot

Cast
Jack Holt as Conway
Harry Carey as Captain Bailey
Sig Ruman as Van Cleve
Eduardo Ciannelli as Dave Reeves
Donald Briggs as Jimmy Rothaker
Irene Ware as Dorothy Kenney
Dick Purcell as Melvin Pierce
Ben Welden as Lefty Shores
Paul Fix as Bill Swanson
George J. Lewis as Ed Morrow

References

External links
 

1940 films
1940s English-language films
American crime films
1940 crime films
Columbia Pictures films
Films directed by Lewis D. Collins
American black-and-white films
1940s American films